Çobanoğlu Mahmud Bey was the fourth and final bey of the Chobanids.

Reign 
During Mahmud's reign, the raids on the Byzantine borders continued. The leadership of these raids was taken by his brother Ali Bey. Ali Bey crossed the Sakarya River during his raids but later signed a treaty with the Byzantines. With this agreement, the Turkmen gathered around Osman Bey of the nascent Ottoman Empire.

In 1309, Suleyman Pasha of the Beylik of Isfendiyar raided Mahmud's palace and killed him. After this event, the Beylik of Choban was absorbed by the Isfendiyarids

References 

13th-century people from the Ottoman Empire
 Chobanids
 History of Kastamonu